Rhagophanes is a monotypic moth genus in the subfamily Arctiinae. Its single species, Rhagophanes tortriciformis, is found on Java in Indonesia. Both the genus and species were first described by Philipp Christoph Zeller in 1853.

References

Lithosiini
Monotypic moth genera
Moths of Indonesia